Ahmed Majan (born  1963) is an Emirati inventor. He has been called the "Emirati Edison" by Gulf News, Jahangir’s World Times, Mena Report, The National, Emirates 24/7, and the Emirati government. Majan is a retired army major in the UAE Armed Forces who obtained an engineering degree in Greece.

One of his inventions, a "smart saddle" for racehorse training, contains solar-powered electronic devices that measure the heart rate of the animal being trained, the rider's weight, a compass and a location tracker, a device to cool the animal's body temperature during exercise in warm climates, and a hidden camera.

, his inventions have won a total of fourteen awards at the British Invention Show (British Inventors Society) in London (2013, six medals), the International Trade Fair for Ideas, Inventions and New Products (IENA) in Nuremberg (2014, four medals), and the International Exhibition of Inventions in Geneva (2015, four medals). He is in the Guinness Book of World Records for building the world's largest bicycle.

He was one of 43 people to be awarded the Medal of Top Emiratis by the Vice President of the UAE in 2014.

References

Emirati inventors
Emirati expatriates in Greece
Living people
1963 births
Emirati aerospace engineers
People from Dubai
United Arab Emirates Army officers
21st-century inventors